Gintautas Mikolaitis (born December 19, 1959) is a Lithuanian engineer and politician, member of the Seimas (Lithuanian parliament) during the 2000–2004, 2004–2008 and 2012–2016 convocations representing the Social Democratic Party of Lithuania.

In 1984, he graduated from the Kaunas Polytechnic Institute with a specialty of mechanical engineering of light industry.

References

External links
Articles regarding Mikolaitis, 

1959 births
Living people
Lithuanian engineers
Members of the Seimas
Social Democratic Party of Lithuania politicians